Apustis is a monotypic moth genus of the family Erebidae. Its only species, Apustis sabulosa, is found in Costa Rica. Both the genus and species were first described by William Schaus in 1913.

References

Hypeninae
Monotypic moth genera